Musa Ali Shama (also known as Eon) is a New York City based educator and a painter of "hip hop cubist" art.

Shama was born in the Bronx, of Palestinian and Brazilian descent. Shama has a Masters of Fine Arts degree from CUNY-Lehman College and studied art education at C.W. Post College / Long Island University. Shama had earned his second master's degree from Queens College, City University of New York in Educational Administration & Supervision. He taught art at his alma mater, Lehman High School in the Bronx for seven years. He previously worked as an Assistant Principal at John F. Kennedy H.S. in the Bronx, and in 2008 became Principal of Francis Lewis High School in Queens, NY. After his principalship, Musa served as a Director for Principal Evaluations and Deputy Superintendent of High Schools in the New York City Department of Education. Ali Shama served as the Superintendent of New Visions Charter High Schools for four years and led the Charter network to a 10% increase in the network graduation rate. In August of 2021, he was named the Executive Vice President of Programs for Virtual Enterprises International and, in April 2022, became President of the national education nonprofit serving over 27,000 students across the country.

Artwork

References

External links 
Ali Shama's Website

American artists
Living people
Year of birth missing (living people)